Dendraster is a genus of sand dollars of the family Dendrasteridae within the order Clypeasteroida. The extant species in this genus are found in the northeast Pacific Ocean from Alaska to Baja California. The best-known, most common and widespread species is D. excentricus.

Species
Listed alphabetically.
Dendraster ashleyi (Arnold) †
Dendraster casseli Grant & Hertlein, 1938 †
Dendraster elsmerensis Durham, 1949 †
Dendraster excentricus (Eschscholtz, 1831) 
Dendraster gibbsii (Remond) †
Dendraster laevis H. L. Clark, 1948 
Dendraster pacificus Kew, 1920 †
Dendraster perrini (Weaver 1908) †
Dendraster rugosus H. L. Clark 
Dendraster terminalis (Grant & Hertlein 1938)
Dendraster vizcainoensis Grant and Hertlein, 1938

References

Dendrasteridae
Echinoidea genera